Purdue University Airport  is a public-use airport in Tippecanoe County, Indiana, United States. Because of the heavy traffic generated by Purdue University and its flight programs, Purdue University Airport is one of the busiest airports in Indiana, second only to Indianapolis International Airport.

According to Federal Aviation Administration records, the airport had 3,778 passenger boardings in calendar year 2017. It is included in the Federal Aviation Administration (FAA) National Plan of Integrated Airport Systems for 2021–2025, in which it is categorized as a regional general aviation facility. The facility no longer offers scheduled commercial airline service. Airline flights operated for about 50 years, then abruptly ended in the mid 2000s.

History
Purdue University Airport was the very first university-owned airport in the United States. In 1930, inventor-industrialist David Ross (one of two people for whom Purdue's Ross–Ade Stadium is named) donated a tract of land to be used as an aeronautical education and research facility at Purdue University. The U.S. government designated Purdue University Airport as an emergency landing strip on November 1, 1930; runway 5/23 was paved later in the 1930s. Amelia Earhart prepared her airplane for her around-the-world flight attempt in Hangar 1 at the airport. Earhart was an adjunct faculty member at the time and the Lockheed Model 10 Electra she flew was purchased for her by the Purdue Research Foundation.

Hundreds of members of the U.S. Army, Navy, and War Training Service were trained at Purdue Airport during World War II, as were several commercial pilots from Latin America. Later, the airport became the home of the first Reserve Officers' Training Corps flight program (1955).

The original hangar, now referred to as the Niswonger Hall of Aviation Technology, still stands and is used by Purdue University's department of Aviation Technology for offices, classrooms, and laboratories.  The bay that held Earhart's plane still contains aircraft; they are used by the Aeronautical Engineering Technology program for maintenance and inspection training.  A large addition to the building was completed in the summer of 2009. A plaque on the building near the side entrance commemorates the airport's history.

In the early 60s, runway 10/28 and a larger hangar were built to support the Midwest Program on Airborne Television Instruction with two DC-6 aircraft.

Purdue University Airport also had its own airline, Purdue Airlines, until 1971.  Originally operating DC-3 aircraft, and then a DC-6, there were later up to three McDonnell Douglas DC-9 (Series 30) aircraft based at the Airport.  One DC-9 that was based at the airport was operated by Purdue Airlines on behalf of, and painted in the livery of, Hugh Hefner for his Playboy jet.

Evergreen International maintained a short-lived cargo operation at the Airport in the late 1970s using Lockheed L-188 Electra turboprop aircraft.

President Ronald Reagan and Air Force One (then a military version of a Boeing 707) visited Purdue University Airport on April 9, 1987. He later wrote a letter concerning a list of questions to the editor of the Purdue Exponent concerning his optimism about the future of relations between the United States and the Soviet Union and his favorable impression of what he saw at Purdue.

The airport has had four airport managers in its history. William Fletemeyer was the airport's first manager. He was succeeded by Robert Stroud who served as manager from 1980 until 2001. Betty Stansbury followed from 2001 to 2017. Adam Baxmeyer, a former employee of United Airlines at LAF, has been at the airport since October 2017.

Airline service 
From the 1950s until the mid-2000s, Purdue University Airport received regularly scheduled commercial air service. The airport saw as many as 45,000 enplanements in 1979. LAF was subsidized through the Essential Air Service until June 1999, when the Department of Transportation cut funding as the airport was 61 miles from the Indianapolis International Airport.

Allegheny Airlines and Lake Central Airlines (both now part of American Airlines) maintained flights to Chicago O'Hare and Pittsburgh until 1975 using Convair 580s as well as BAC 111-200s.

Indiana Airways, a local commuter airline, operated from November 1977 until March 1980. The small airline operated Cessna 402s as well as Piper Navajo Chieftains to fly directly to Indianapolis, as well as to Fort Wayne and Cincinnati through Indianapolis. Air Wisconsin offered direct flights to Chicago O'Hare and Fort Wayne from February 1971 through 1985. 
Fischer Brothers Aviation, which would go on to be acquired by Midway Airlines, causing it to be rebranded as 'Midway Connection,' operated flights between LAF and Midway International Airport from 1984 to 1989.

Britt Airways operated flights to and from Purdue between 1984 and 1989. Piedmont Airlines also flew to LAF through the second half of the 1980s. Comair also briefly flew six daily round-trip flights to Cincinnati on an EMB 110 in 1987. US Airways, which was known as US Air at the time, served LAF from 1988 to 1991.

Starting in 1989, Simmons Airlines offered six daily round trip flights to O'Hare under the American Eagle name until 1995. Great Lakes Airlines operated daily flights to Chicago O'Hare and the Coles County Memorial Airport on a Beechcraft 1900 under the name of United Express. These flights operated from 1995 until February 2001. Northwest Airlines (via Mesaba Air) also offered service to Detroit on Saab 340s starting in 1992 until December 2002.

Lastly, AmericanConnection (via Corporate Airlines) offered daily service to St. Louis on BAe Jestreams. This was the airport's last regular scheduled airline service and operated from December 2002 until February 15, 2004.

In 2009, the airport proposed two daily round-trip flights to and from Chicago O'Hare. The service, which would have been operated by ExpressJet, never passed the planning phase. In August 2017, the Lafayette Journal & Courier reported that the airport was working to restore commercial air service.

Facilities and aircraft 
Purdue University Airport has an FAA-staffed air traffic control tower and is the second busiest tower in Indiana.

The airport covers an area of 527 acres (213 ha) at an elevation of 606 feet (185 m) above mean sea level. It has two asphalt paved runways: 10/28 is 6,600 by 150 feet (2,012 x 46 m) and 5/23 is 4,225 by 100 feet (1,288 x 30 m).

Runway 10 has a Category 1 ILS approach.
Runways 10 and 28 are both served by GPS WAAS approaches.
Additionally, a VOR-A approach is available.

Runway 10 is occasionally used in a shortened configuration: aircraft land at the beginning of the runway but do not use its full length to stop.  Instead, they hold short of the intersecting runway 5/23.  Known as a land and hold short operation (LAHSO), this procedure is relatively common in the United States and allows both runways to be used at the same time.  Pilots have the ability to reject the LAHSO clearance if they need the full runway to ensure a safe landing.

Runway 23 has a displaced threshold, which shortens the runway to 3,913 ft for landing operations.

For the 12-month period ending December 31, 2019, the airport had 117,727 aircraft operations, an average of 322 per day: 99% general aviation, 1% air taxi, and <1% military/commercial. In December 2020, there were 84 aircraft based at this airport: 73 single-engine, 7 multi-engine, 2 jet, and 2 helicopter.

FedEx donated a 727 to Purdue, which was eventually torn apart. United Airlines donated a 737, which was subsequently torn apart and given to the Department of Aviation Technology's aircraft mechanics program. In October 2014, Comair donated a Bombardier CRJ-100, which was then customized with Purdue logos near the cabin door and on the tail.

The airport is also home to two medical helicopters.  One of the helicopters, an EC-145, is operated by Metro Aviation, Inc. for IU Health LifeLine.

The airport has one passenger terminal, which was used for air service until early 2004 and has space for two airline gates. The building was built in 1943 as hangar-2, was renovated in 1979 to provide screening for airline passengers and again in 1984, including a new entrance, concourse, and baggage claim area. It currently houses an aviation library and airport administration offices. Its functionality as an airline terminal is still regularly used for charters for Purdue Sports.  A new terminal on the west side of the airfield was planned in the 1980s. These plans were later altered to include a new terminal on the east side of the airfield in the early 2000s, but neither of these plans ever came to fruition.

References

Notes

Bibliography

External links
  at the Purdue University website
 Key Events in the History of the Purdue Airport
 National Air Traffic Controllers Association LAF HOMEPAGE
 Aerial image as of April 1998 from USGS The National Map
 
 

Airports in Indiana
Transportation buildings and structures in Tippecanoe County, Indiana
University and college airports
Former Essential Air Service airports